In solid-state physics, a band gap, also called a bandgap or energy gap, is an energy range in a solid where no electronic states exist. In graphs of the electronic band structure of solids, the band gap refers to the energy difference (often expressed in electronvolts) between the top of the valence band and the bottom of the conduction band in insulators and semiconductors.  It is the energy required to promote an electron from the valence band to the conduction band. The resulting conduction-band electron (and the electron hole in the valence band) are free to move within the crystal lattice and serve as charge carriers to conduct electric current.  It is closely related to the HOMO/LUMO gap in chemistry. If the valence band is completely full and the conduction band is completely empty, then electrons cannot move within the solid because there are no available states. If the electrons are not free to move within the crystal lattice, then there is no generated current due to no net charge carrier mobility. However, if some electrons transfer from the valence band (mostly full) to the conduction band (mostly empty), then current can flow (see carrier generation and recombination). Therefore, the band gap is a major factor determining the electrical conductivity of a solid. Substances having large band gaps (also called "wide" band gaps) are generally insulators, those with small band gaps (also called "narrow" band gaps) are semiconductor, and conductors either have very small band gaps or none, because the valence and conduction bands overlap to form a continuous band.

In semiconductor physics

Every solid has its own characteristic energy-band structure. This variation in band structure is responsible for the wide range of electrical characteristics observed in various materials.
Depending on the dimension, the band structure and spectroscopy can vary. The different types of dimensions are as listed: one dimension, two dimensions, and three dimensions.

In semiconductors and insulators, electrons are confined to a number of bands of energy, and forbidden from other regions because there are no allowable electronic states for them to occupy. The term "band gap" refers to the energy difference between the top of the valence band and the bottom of the conduction band.  Electrons are able to jump from one band to another. However, in order for a valence band electron to be promoted to the conduction band, it requires a specific minimum amount of energy for the transition. This required energy is an intrinsic characteristic of the solid material. Electrons can gain enough energy to jump to the conduction band by absorbing either a phonon (heat) or a photon (light).

A semiconductor is a material with an intermediate-sized, non-zero band gap that behaves as an insulator at T=0K, but allows thermal excitation of electrons into its conduction band at temperatures that are below its melting point. In contrast, a material with a large band gap is an insulator. In conductors, the valence and conduction bands may overlap, so there is no longer a bandgap with forbidden regions of electronic states.

The conductivity of intrinsic semiconductors is strongly dependent on the band gap. The only available charge carriers for conduction are the electrons that have enough thermal energy to be excited across the band gap and the electron holes that are left off when such an excitation occurs.

Band-gap engineering is the process of controlling or altering the band gap of a material by controlling the composition of certain semiconductor alloys, such as GaAlAs, InGaAs, and InAlAs. It is also possible to construct layered materials with alternating compositions by techniques like molecular-beam epitaxy. These methods are exploited in the design of heterojunction bipolar transistors (HBTs), laser diodes and solar cells.

The distinction between semiconductors and insulators is a matter of convention. One approach is to think of semiconductors as a type of insulator with a narrow band gap. Insulators with a larger band gap, usually greater than 4 eV, are not considered semiconductors and generally do not exhibit semiconductive behaviour under practical conditions. Electron mobility also plays a role in determining a material's informal classification.

The band-gap energy of semiconductors tends to decrease with increasing temperature. When temperature increases, the amplitude of atomic vibrations increase, leading to larger interatomic spacing. The interaction between the lattice phonons and the free electrons and holes will also affect the band gap to a smaller extent. The relationship between band gap energy and temperature can be described by Varshni's empirical expression (named after Y. P. Varshni),
, where Eg(0), α and β are material constants.

Furthermore, lattice vibrations increase with temperature, which increases the effect of electron scattering. Additionally, the number of charge carriers within a semiconductor will increase, as more carriers have the energy required to cross the band-gap threshold and so conductivity of semiconductors also increases with increasing temperature.

In a regular semiconductor crystal, the band gap is fixed owing to continuous energy states. In a quantum dot crystal, the band gap is size dependent and can be altered to produce a range of energies between the valence band and conduction band. It is also known as quantum confinement effect.

Band gaps also depend on pressure. Band gaps can be either direct or indirect, depending on the electronic band structure of the material.

It was mentioned earlier that the dimensions have different band structure and spectroscopy. For non-metallic solids, which are one dimensional, have optical properties that are dependent on the electronic transitions between valence and conduction bands. In addition, the spectroscopic transition probability is between the initial and final orbital and it depends on the integral. φi is the initial orbital, φf is the final orbital, ʃ φf*ûεφi is the integral, ε is the electric vector, and u is the dipole moment.

Two-dimensional structures of solids behave because of the overlap of atomic orbitals. The simplest two-dimensional crystal contains identical atoms arranged on a square lattice. Energy splitting occurs at the Brillouin zone edge for one-dimensional situations because of a weak periodic potential, which produces a gap between bands. The behavior of the one-dimensional situations does not occur for two-dimensional cases because there are extra freedoms of motion. Furthermore, a bandgap can be produced with strong periodic potential for two-dimensional and three-dimensional cases.

Direct and indirect band gap

Based on the their band structure, materials are characterised with a direct band gap or indirect band gap. In the free-electron model, k is the momentum of a free electron and assumes unique values within the Brillouin zone that outlines the periodicity of the crystal lattice. If the momentum of the lowest energy state in the conduction band and the highest energy state of the valence band of a material have the same value, then the material has a direct bandgap. If they are not the same, then the material has an indirect band gap and the electronic transition must undergo momentum transfer to satisfy conservation. Such indirect "forbidden" transitions still occur, however at very low probabilities and weaker energy. For materials with a direct band gap, valence electrons can be directly excited into the conduction band by a photon whose energy is larger than the bandgap. In contrast, for materials with an indirect band gap, a photon and phonon must both be involved in a transition from the valence band top to the conduction band bottom, involving a momentum change. Therefore, direct bandgap materials tend to have stronger light emission and absorption properties and tend to be better suited for photovoltaics (PVs), light-emitting diodes (LEDs), and laser diodes; however, indirect bandgap materials are frequently used in PVs and LEDs when the materials have other favorable properties.

Light-emitting diodes and laser diodes

LEDs and laser diodes usually emit photons with energy close to and slightly larger than the band gap of the semiconductor material from which they are made. Therefore, as the band gap energy increases, the LED or laser color changes from infrared to red, through the rainbow to violet, then to UV.

Photovoltaic cells

The optical band gap (see below) determines what portion of the solar spectrum a photovoltaic cell absorbs. A semiconductor will not absorb photons of energy less than the band gap; and the energy of the electron-hole pair produced by a photon is equal to the bandgap energy. A luminescent solar converter uses a luminescent medium to downconvert photons with energies above the band gap to photon energies closer to the band gap of the semiconductor comprising the solar cell.

List of band gaps
Below are band gap values for some selected materials. For a comprehensive list of band gaps in semiconductors, see List of semiconductor materials.

Optical versus electronic bandgap
In materials with a large exciton binding energy, it is possible for a photon to have just barely enough energy to create an exciton (bound electron–hole pair), but not enough energy to separate the electron and hole (which are electrically attracted to each other). In this situation, there is a distinction between "optical band gap" and "electronic band gap" (or "transport gap"). The optical bandgap is the threshold for photons to be absorbed, while the transport gap is the threshold for creating an electron–hole pair that is not bound together. The optical bandgap is at lower energy than the transport gap.

In almost all inorganic semiconductors, such as silicon, gallium arsenide, etc., there is very little interaction between electrons and holes (very small exciton binding energy), and therefore the optical and electronic bandgap are essentially identical, and the distinction between them is ignored. However, in some systems, including organic semiconductors and single-walled carbon nanotubes, the distinction may be significant.

Band gaps for other quasi-particles
In photonics, band gaps or stop bands are ranges of photon frequencies where, if tunneling effects are neglected, no photons can be transmitted through a material. A material exhibiting this behaviour is known as a photonic crystal. The concept of hyperuniformity has broadened the range of photonic band gap materials, beyond photonic crystals. By applying the technique in supersymmetric quantum mechanics, a new class of optical disordered materials has been suggested, which support band gaps perfectly equivalent to those of crystals or quasicrystals.

Similar physics applies to phonons in a phononic crystal.

Materials

 Aluminium gallium arsenide
 Boron nitride
 Indium gallium arsenide
 Indium arsenide
 Gallium arsenide
 Gallium nitride
 Germanium
 Metallic hydrogen

List of electronics topics

 Electronics
 Bandgap voltage reference
 Condensed matter physics
 Direct and indirect bandgaps
 Electrical conduction
 Electron hole
 Field-effect transistor
 Light-emitting diode
 Photodiode
 Photoresistor
 Photovoltaics
 Solar cell
 Solid state physics
 Semiconductor
 Semiconductor devices
 Strongly correlated material
 Valence band

See also
 Wide-bandgap semiconductors
 Band bending
 Spectral density
 Pseudogap
 Tauc plot
 Moss–Burstein effect
Urbach energy

References

External links
 Direct Band Gap Energy Calculator
 

Electron states
Electronic band structures
Quantum mechanics
Spectroscopy
Nuclear magnetic resonance